Joseph Hendrix Himes (August 15, 1885 – September 9, 1960) was an American politician and one-term U.S. Representative from Ohio from 1921 to 1923.

Life and career
Born in New Oxford, Pennsylvania, Himes attended the public schools, Gettysburg College, and Pennsylvania State College. He was employed in the steel industry and later engaged as banker.

Himes was elected as a Republican to the Sixty-seventh Congress (March 4, 1921 – March 3, 1923). He was an unsuccessful candidate in 1922 for reelection to the Sixty-eighth Congress.  He then moved to Frederick, MD in 1925 and took possession of the mansion known as Prospect Hall (Frederick, Maryland) where he lived with his family until 1958, entertaining and hosting dignitaries and US Presidents like Franklin Delano Roosevelt en route to Shangri-La, later dubbed Camp David.

Himes was the founder, president, and chairman of the board of directors of Group Hospitalization, Inc., Washington, D.C. He engaged in various business interests in Washington, New York City, and elsewhere.

He died in Washington, D.C., on September 9, 1960, and was interred in Fort Lincoln Cemetery.

Sources

External links
 

1885 births
1960 deaths
People from Adams County, Pennsylvania
People from Stark County, Ohio
Gettysburg College alumni
Pennsylvania State University alumni
20th-century American politicians
Republican Party members of the United States House of Representatives from Ohio